The 1983 All-Ireland Senior Camogie Championship Final was the 52nd All-Ireland Final and the deciding match of the 1983 All-Ireland Senior Camogie Championship, an inter-county camogie tournament for the top teams in Ireland.

Dublin led 1-4 to 1-3 at half-time, but a late Claire Kelleher goal gave Cork their fourth title in six years.

References

All-Ireland Senior Camogie Championship Final
All-Ireland Senior Camogie Championship Final
All-Ireland Senior Camogie Championship Final, 1983
All-Ireland Senior Camogie Championship Finals
Cork county camogie team matches
Dublin county camogie team matches